Abdullah Mohammed Al-Kibsi was a Yemeni politician who was a Minister of Culture of Yemen.

Life
Al-Kibsi served as a member of the parliament in Yemen and brigadier general in the military.

In September 2022, he was murdered outside his house in Sana'a. The person who murdered him was arrested on 3 September 2022.

References

2022 deaths
Assassinated Yemeni politicians